Symmachia menetas is a species in the butterfly family Riodinidae found in Brazil and Suriname. It was first described by Dru Drury in 1782.

Description 
Upperside. Antennae black. Front of the head yellow. Thorax black, with two yellow streaks at the base of the wings. Abdomen dark brown. Half of the superior wings black, beginning at the shoulders, and running to the external edges, on which are seven cream-coloured spots variously shaped. The other half of these wings is scarlet, without any marks. Posterior wings entirely scarlet, edged with black.

Underside. Palpi cream coloured. Breast and abdomen light yellow. Legs black, but underneath pale yellow. Wings coloured as on the upperside. Margins of the wings entire. Wingspan  inches (33 mm).

Subspecies
Symmachia menetas menetas (Brazil, Suriname)
Symmachia menetas eurina Schaus, 1902 (Brazil: Paraná, Santa Catarina)

Sources 

 
Riodinidae of South America
Butterflies described in 1782
Descriptions from Illustrations of Exotic Entomology